Bijagual is a corregimiento in David District, Chiriquí Province, Panama. Its population as of 1990 was 610; its population as of 2000 was 625.

References

Corregimientos of Chiriquí Province